Joseph E. Fischoff and the South Bend Chamber Music Society (South Bend, Indiana, USA) founded the Fischoff National Chamber Music Competition in 1973 as a way of encouraging young people to pursue chamber music study and performance. Today, the Fischoff National Chamber Music Association is a United States 501(c)3 nonprofit corporation led by a team of staff, supported by members of a National Advisory Council, and governed by a board of directors.

Competition 

The Fischoff Competition grew from 6 ensembles in 1973 to 48 ensembles in both wind and string categories as of 2009. An average of 22 different nationalities are represented each year by foreign nationals from South America, Asia, and Europe. Fischoff is the only national chamber music competition with both senior and junior divisions (age 18 and younger), and is the largest. Winning a prize at the Fischoff is a coveted honor for young chamber musicians across the nation and around the world. The winners of the Senior Division Gold Medals also participate in the Double Gold Tour

The primary focus of the competition has always been education. In this way, it is quite different from most competitions. Written comments and personal critiques from jurors help young emerging chamber musicians better their interpretation and performance. Master classes are also offered to junior division quarterfinalist ensembles.

Educational outreach programs 

Fischoff's Residency programs were recognized as "outstanding" and were one of two Indiana programs highlighted in the 2007 National Endowment for the Arts Annual Report.

In May 2009, the State of Indiana General Assembly honored Fischoff for its innovative programs introducing young people to chamber music.

In August 2013, Fischoff received the 2014 Leighton Award for Nonprofit Excellence, awarded by the Community Foundation of St. Joseph County.

The Mentoring Program provides an opportunity for regional high school chamber ensembles to receive coaching by professional area musicians at no charge.

Peer Ambassadors for Chamber Music (PACMan) pairs Junior Division Fischoff Competition ensembles with younger students, to offer an introduction to chamber music in a kids-teaching-kids model.

External links
 Fischoff - official site

References

Music organizations based in the United States
South Bend, Indiana
Non-profit organizations based in Indiana
Education in Indiana